Callipielus argentata is a species of moth of the family Hepialidae. It is known from Chile and Argentina.

References

External links
Hepialidae genera

Moths described in 1957
Hepialidae
Endemic fauna of Chile